Unstructured Operation Markup Language (UOML) is an XML-based markup language acting as a point of interaction, which defines a set of rules for processing electronic documents.

References

External links
 
 UOML at oasis-open.org.

Markup languages